Fabius was the son of Hercules and an unnamed mother in Roman mythology.

Fabius may also refer to:

People 
 Saint Fabius (died 303 or 304), Roman Catholic saint
 Quintus Fabius Maximus Verrucosus, surnamed Cunctator (c. 280 – 203 BC), Roman statesman and general
 Fabius Constable (born 1973), Italian celtic harp player
 Fabius Maximus Stanly (1815–1882), US Navy rear admiral
 François Fabius (1944–2006), French antiquarian and equestrian
 Laurent Fabius (born 1946), French politician
 Fabia gens, an ancient Roman family with many members named Fabius

Places in the United States 
 Fabius, Missouri, an unincorporated community
 Fabius (town), New York 
 Fabius (village), New York, within the town
 Fabius, West Virginia, an unincorporated community
 Fabius Township (disambiguation)
 Fabius River, Missouri

Other uses 
 Fabius (horse), a Thoroughbred racehorse
 Exercise Fabius, a 1944 rehearsal for the World War II Normandy landings

See also 
 Fabia gens
 Fabian (disambiguation)
 Fabio